"Tobacco Road" is a blues song written and first recorded by John D. Loudermilk in December 1959 and released in 1960.  This song became a hit for The Nashville Teens in 1964 and has since become a standard across several musical genres.

Loudermilk original
Originally framed as a folk song, "Tobacco Road" was a semi-autobiographical tale of growing up in Durham, North Carolina.  Released on Columbia Records, it was not a hit for Loudermilk, achieving only minor chart success in Australia.  Other artists, however, immediately began recording and performing the song.

Nashville Teens hit

The English group The Nashville Teens' garage rock/blues rock rendering was a bold effort featuring prominent piano, electric guitar, and bass drum parts and a dual lead vocal. Mickie Most produced it with the same tough-edged-pop feel that he brought to The Animals' hits. "Tobacco Road" was a trans-Atlantic pop hit in 1964, reaching number 6 on the UK singles chart and number 14 on the U.S. singles chart.  While the Teens would have some further success in the UK, in the U.S. "Tobacco Road" became another one-hit wonder of the British Invasion.

The Jefferson Airplane recorded a version of Tobacco Road on their first album, Jefferson Airplane Takes Off, in 1966. It was one of only two songs on their first album not written by a member of the band. Takes Off was the only album they recorded with their original lead singer Signe Anderson. Signe, who was a fabulous vocalist for JA, left the band to be a full time parent of her newly born child, which is when JA recruited Grace Slick from the band Great Society.  Their sound on Takes Off and on Tobacco Road with Signe was melodic folk rock. However with the addition of Grace Slick the Chrome Nun, who brought White Rabbit with her, they became much more rock and less folk on the next album and kept heading in that direction.

British psychedelic band Spooky Tooth recorded a version in 1968 for their debut album, It's All About.

Later versions and uses
In the 1970s, songwriters Nicky Chinn and Mike Chapman claimed to have been inspired by "Tobacco Road" while writing The Sweet's "Block Buster!", after accusations of stealing the guitar riff from David Bowie's "Jean Genie".

The song became a hit for Edgar Winter on his debut album Entrance and he plays a 17-minute live version of the song on the double LP Roadwork from 1972.

Roy Clark included the song on his 1986 album Rockin' in the Country. His version peaked at number 56 on the Billboard Hot Country Singles chart.

David Lee Roth covered the song on his 1986 album Eat 'Em and Smile.

References

External links
 Loudermilk fan site – extensive history of song and recorded versions.

1960 songs
1964 singles
1970 singles
British garage rock songs
British blues rock songs
Eric Burdon songs
War (American band) songs
John D. Loudermilk songs
David Lee Roth songs
Roy Clark songs
North Carolina in fiction
Songs about roads
Songs written by John D. Loudermilk
Song recordings produced by Jerry Goldstein (producer)
Song recordings produced by Mickie Most
Songs about poverty
Decca Records singles
London Records singles
MGM Records singles